Desmethoxycurcumin is a curcuminoid found in turmeric. Commercial grade curcumin contains a mixture of curcuminoids (desmethoxycurcumin 10–20%, bisdesmethoxycurcumin 5% or less).

See also 
 Bis-desmethoxycurcumin
 Curcumin

References 

Curcuminoids
Food colorings
Phenol antioxidants
Vinylogous carboxylic acids